Yang Jiayu (born 18 February 1996) is a female Chinese race walker who specialises in the 10 kilometres and 20 kilometres race walk. She was the gold medallist over 20 km at the 2017 World Championships in Athletics.

Biography
In May 2014 she participated in the 2014 World Cup, placing second in the Women's 10 km (Junior) event in 43:37, behind Duan Dandan.

On August 13, 2017 she became champion in the 20 km race at the 2017 World Championships with a personal best of 1:26:18, ahead of Mexican María Guadalupe González (1:26:19, season's best) and Italian Antonella Palmisano (1:26:36, personal best.)  Her compatriot, Lü Xiuzhi, was dramatically disqualified just about 20 meters away from winning the bronze medal.

In 2019, she competed in the women's 20 kilometres walk event at the 2019 World Athletics Championships held in Doha, Qatar. She was disqualified after a fourth red card.

In 2021, she set a new world record in the women's 20km race walk with a time of 1:23:49 at the Chinese Race Walking Championships in Huangshan.

See also
China at the 2017 World Championships in Athletics

References

External links
 
 

1996 births
Living people
Chinese female racewalkers
World Athletics Championships athletes for China
World Athletics Championships winners
World Athletics Championships medalists
Asian Games gold medalists for China
Asian Games medalists in athletics (track and field)
Athletes (track and field) at the 2018 Asian Games
Medalists at the 2018 Asian Games
Asian Games gold medalists in athletics (track and field)
Athletes (track and field) at the 2020 Summer Olympics
Olympic athletes of China
Universiade medalists in athletics (track and field)
Universiade silver medalists for China